Luculia gratissima is a species of flowering plant in the family Rubiaceae. It is an ornamental plant that is found from the central Himalayas to northern Indo-China.

The Latin specific epithet gratissima means "most pleasing" or "most agreeable". 

As it does not tolerate temperatures below , it requires cultivation under glass in temperate zones. However, it may be placed outside in a sheltered, sunny spot during the summer months. It is a recipient of the Royal Horticultural Society's Award of Garden Merit.

References

External links
 Luculia in the World Checklist of Rubiaceae
 Luculia gratissima, Nepal checklist 
 Luculia gratissima specimens at Berkeley Natural History Museums 
 Luculia gratissima at uniprot.org

Enigmatic Rubiaceae taxa
Flora of Tibet
Flora of Nepal
Flora of East Himalaya
Flora of Indo-China